Mount Ader is a mountain along the north side of Breguet Glacier and just southeast of Mount Cornu, in northern Graham Land. It was first shown on an Argentine government chart in 1957. It was named by the United Kingdom Antarctic Place-Names Committee (UK-APC) in 1960 for Clément Ader, a French pioneer aeronaut - probably the first man to leave the ground in a heavier-than-air machine solely as the result of an engine contained in it.

Mountains of Graham Land
Davis Coast